Rzhanovo is a village in the municipality of Struga, North Macedonia.

References

Villages in Struga Municipality
Albanian communities in North Macedonia